Hilderbrand may refer to:

Hilderbrand, Missouri, an unincorporated community
Hilderbrand, West Virginia, an unincorporated community in Monongalia County
Elin Hilderbrand, an American romance novel writer